Rinzia crassifolia, commonly known as the Darling Range rinzia, is a plant species of the family Myrtaceae endemic to Western Australia.

It blooms between August to September producing white-pink flowers.

It is found on rises and among rocky outcrops in the western Wheatbelt and the Swan Coastal Plain regions of Western Australia where it grows in sandy or clay soils over laterite.

References

crassifolia
Endemic flora of Western Australia
Myrtales of Australia
Rosids of Western Australia
Plants described in 1852
Taxa named by Nikolai Turczaninow